Home is a 2018 Hindi web series  created by Ekta Kapoor for her video on demand platform ALTBalaji. The series stars a stellar cast comprising Annu Kapoor, Supriya Pilgaonkar, Amol Parashar, Parikshit Sahni and Chetna Pandey and is directed by Habib Faisal. The web series revolves around the bond of a family and their fight against the system due to which they have to empty their 'Home'.

The series is available for streaming on the ALT Balaji App and its associated websites since its release date.

Plot
The series revolves around a fictional middle-class Sethi family. The series explores how the family hold on to their values and find happiness in little things. But their world comes crashing down when they are served an eviction notice by the authorities. The series explores how the fight the authorities, corporations and government to save their home.

Cast
 Annu Kapoor as  Himansh Brijmohan Sethi,  father of Vansh & Hina
 Supriya Pilgaonkar as Vandana Himansh Sethi,  Mother of Hina
 Amol Parashar as Vansh Himansh Sethi
 Parikshit Sahni as Brijmohan Sethi,  Father of Himansh & Hriday
 Chetna Pande as Hina Rishi Shah,  Himansh & Vandana Sethi's Elder Daughter
 Himani Shivpuri as Nirmala Manchanda
 Paritosh Sand as Hriday Brijmohan Sethi 
 Pankaj Kalra as Mr.Motwani
 Avinash Kunte as Me. Gehi
 Fahmaan Khan as Rishi Shah, Hina's husband
 Sunny Hinduja as Mohsin
 Khalida Jan as Zulfiya,  Mohsin's wife
 Ankit Shah as Pawan Gehi
Sumit Suri as Karan Bajaj
Amal Sehrawat as Vaibhav Suman

Awards

Reception 
Supriya from The Quint writes "Though Home is among the better offerings of Balaji Telefilms, the demolition-themed web series could have done with some trimming of its own."

References

External links
 Watch HOME on ALT Balaji website
 

2018 web series debuts
Hindi-language web series
ALTBalaji original programming
Indian drama web series